Qaleh Juq Rural District is in Anguran District of Mahneshan County, Zanjan province, Iran. At the National Census of 2006, its population was 5,795 in 1,288 households. There were 4,997 inhabitants in 1,542 households at the following census of 2011. At the most recent census of 2016, the population of the rural district was 4,496 in 1,437 households. The largest of its 32 villages was Duzkand, with 556 people.

References 

Mahneshan County

Rural Districts of Zanjan Province

Populated places in Zanjan Province

Populated places in Mahneshan County